Mary Harriott Norris (March 16, 1848 – September 14, 1918) was an American author and educator.

Born in Boonton, New Jersey to Charles Bryan Norris and Mary Lyon Kerr, she was educated at Vassar College, where she graduated with honor, receiving an A.B. degree in 1870. Two years later in 1872 she was invited back to deliver the annual commencement address to the college. She became a writer of short stories, novels, and educational articles; she edited several works and gave a number of lectures. Norris was a regular contributor to the Boston Journal of Education.

In 1879, she became principal of a private school she founded in New York City, serving at that post until 1891. From 1898–9, she served as Dean of Women at Northwestern University, being the first regularly elected representative to hold that post. Three times she travelled to Europe, visiting Great Britain, Italy, the Scandinavian countries, Netherlands, and Switzerland.

Bibliography
Her published works include the following:

 Fräulein Mina (1872)
 School-life of Ben and Bentie (1884)
 Dorothy Delafield (1886)
 A Damsel of the Eighteenth Century (1889)
 Phoebe (1890)
 Silas Marner (1890), editor
 Marmion (1891), editor
 Afterward (1893)
 The Nine Blessings (1893)
 John Applegate, Surgeon (1894)
 Lakewood (1895)
 Evangeline (1897), editor
 Kenilworth (1898), editor
 The Gray House of the Quarries (1898)
 Quentin Duward (1899), editor
 The Grapes of Wrath (1901)
 The Story of Christine (1907)
 The Veil (1907)
 The Golden Age of Vassar (1915)

References

External links
 

1848 births
1918 deaths
People from Boonton, New Jersey
American women short story writers
Vassar College alumni
American women novelists
19th-century American novelists
19th-century American women writers
20th-century American novelists
20th-century American women writers
Educators from New Jersey
Novelists from New Jersey
Northwestern University faculty
19th-century American short story writers
20th-century American short story writers
Novelists from Illinois
American women academics